New Hampshire's 6th State Senate district is one of 24 districts in the New Hampshire Senate. It has  been represented by Republican James Gray since 2016, succeeding fellow Republican Sam Cataldo.

Geography
District 6 covers parts of Belknap and Strafford Counties, including the towns of Alton, Barnstead, Farmington, Gilmanton, New Durham, and Rochester.

The district is located entirely within New Hampshire's 1st congressional district. It borders the state of Maine.

Recent election results

2020

2018

2016

2014

2012

Federal and statewide results in District 6

References

6
Belknap County, New Hampshire
Strafford County, New Hampshire